Meolo is a town in the Metropolitan City of Venice, Veneto, northern Italy. It is south of SR89 regional road.

Sources

External links
(Google Maps)

Cities and towns in Veneto